The Pangaltı Armenian Cemetery was located in the Pangaltı quarter of Istanbul near Taksim Square and originally belonged to the Surp Agop Armenian Hospital. In the 1930s it was demolished and was replaced with the Taksim Gezi Park, Divan Hotel, Hilton Hotel, Hyatt Regency Hotel, and the TRT Radio Buildings. 

It is considered to have been the largest non-Muslim cemetery in Istanbul's history.

History
 The Pangaltı cemetery was founded in 1560 after an epidemic caused the Armenian community of Constantinople to petition Sultan Suleyman.  It was enlarged in 1780 and enclosed by a wall in 1853. The Pera district was very close to the cemetery, so an outbreak of cholera in 1865 led the government to ban burials and allocate them to the Şişli Armenian Cemetery instead. 

The Pangaltı cemetery was demolished in the 1930s and in 1939 its marble tombstones were sold and used to build the Gezi Park's fountains and stairs. Other parts of the cemetery were used to construct Eminönü square which was, along with Gezi Park, designed by city planner Henri Prost.

In 2013, during excavation work for the reconstruction of Taksim square, 16 tombstones from the Armenian cemetery were discovered.

Legal Case
In 1932 Mesrob Naroyan, the Armenian Patriarchate of Constantinople, filed a lawsuit for the return of the property, but the Istanbul Municipality argued that he had been a legal non-entity in Turkey since 1916 (the position of Armenian Patriarchate had been officially suspended in 1916 as part of the Armenian genocide)  and therefore had no title to the land, even though he still functioned at the Armenian Patriarchate of Constantinople in Kumkapı, Istanbul.

The Patriarchate acknowledged the lack of title, but argued legitimacy to represent the cemetery on behalf of both the Armenian Catholic Community and the Surp Agop Armenian Hospital.

The commission to investigate land ownership found the Patriarch's claims groundless, so title remained with the Istanbul municipality and the third party owners.

See also
Armenians in Turkey
Confiscated Armenian Properties in Turkey

References

Armenian cemeteries
Cemeteries in Istanbul
Demolished buildings and structures in Istanbul
Eastern Orthodox cemeteries
Şişli